The Combine was the name given to the association between exhibitor Union Theatres and the production and distribution company Australasian Films on 6 January 1913. The Combine had a powerful influence on the Australian film industry of the 1910s and 1920s and was frequently the subject of criticism for hampering Australian production, including by filmmakers such as Raymond Longford.

History
On 4 March 1911 the firm of Johnson and Gibson merged with J and N Tait to form Amalgamated Pictures. This company then merged with the General Film Company of Australia, West's Pictures and Spencer's Pictures then, in January 1913, Greater J.D. Williams Amusement Company.  In some states the name "Union Theatres" remained the recognised name, despite the "Combine" name.

The Combine dominated the Australian film industry for a number of years and later evolved into the Greater Union organisation.

References

1910s in Australian cinema
Film organisations in Australia
1913 in film
1913 in Australia